105th meridian may refer to:

105th meridian east, a line of longitude east of the Greenwich Meridian
105th meridian west, a line of longitude west of the Greenwich Meridian